Shark Key is an island in the lower Florida Keys about  east of Key West.

It is located north of, and connected to, U.S. 1  (or the Overseas Highway) at approximately mile marker 11.5, between the Saddlebunch Keys and Big Coppitt Key.  It is part of the census-designated place of Big Coppitt Key, Florida.

Its earlier name was Stark Key.

References 

Islands of Monroe County, Florida
Unincorporated communities in Monroe County, Florida
Suburbs of Key West
Islands of the Florida Keys
Islands of Florida
Unincorporated communities in Florida